Alan Carr: Chatty Man is a British chat show hosted by Alan Carr on Channel 4 that began in 2009. The sixteenth and final series premiered on 3 March 2016.

Overnight ratings are taken from Digital Spy and will be replaced if official ratings are released from BARB. Official ratings may include Channel 4 +1 if available.

Episodes

Series 1

Series 2 
A second series began airing on 19 November 2009. Christmas and New Year's specials were confirmed and aired in December.

Series 3 
A new series began on 4 February 2010 for 8 episodes.

Series 4 
Series 4 premiered on 20 June 2010 for a 12-episode run.

Series 5 
Series 5 began on 13 December 2010 and included 3 Christmas/New Year's specials.

Series 6 
Series 6 moved to Friday nights beginning on 17 June 2011.

Series 7 
Series 7 moved back to Sunday nights beginning on 30 October.

Series 8 
Series 8 began on 27 April 2012.

Series 9 
The ninth series of the show premiered on Friday 14 September 2012 for a 14-episode run.

Series 10 
The tenth series of the show premiered on 1 March 2013 and ran for twelve episodes.

Series 11 
The eleventh series of the show began on 30 August 2013. The show celebrated its 100th episode on 27 September 2013.

Series 12 
The twelfth series began on 28 March 2014.

Series 13 
The thirteenth series began on 12 September 2014.

Series 14 
The fourteenth series began on 20 March 2015.

Series 15 
The fifteenth series began on 11 September 2015.

Series 16 
The sixteenth series moved to Thursday nights and began airing on 3 March 2016. It was then announced that Series 16 would be the final series of Chatty Man.

Christmas special (2016)
It was announced on 9 October 2016 that Chatty Man had been cancelled after Series 16 due to low ratings. It was then confirmed that there would be a Christmas Day special.

Christmas special (2017)
A Christmas special of Chatty Man aired on 25 December 2017.

References

Lists of British comedy television series episodes
Lists of British non-fiction television series episodes
Lists of variety television series episodes